State Road 17 (SR 17), also formerly known as U.S. Route 27 Alternate (US 27 Alt.), is a north–south state road in the U.S. state of Florida.  It is split into two sections. The road provides scenic views as it winds through the hills of the Lake Wales Ridge.

Route description

Southern segment
It runs from Sebring in Highlands County as "Lakeview Drive." It goes through downtown Sebring as "Ridgewood Drive" before continuing north-northwest of the city, entering Avon Park from the east as "Cornell Street."

At a four-way stop, it turns north, following Memorial Drive until it reaches Main Street, then it goes west through Avon Park's downtown until it intersects US 27/98.

Northern segment
A section runs from US 27/98 in Polk County, southwest of Frostproof. It bisects that town, taking the name "Scenic Highway" as it winds through Hillcrest Heights, Babson Park and Lake Wales. It continues north, taking names Main Street in Dundee, Hamilton Blvd in Lake Hamilton, and 10th Street in Haines City, where it ends at US 17/92.

Major intersections

Related roads

County Road 17

County Road 17 (CR 17) exists as a sort of northern extension of SR 17. It travels northwest from the historic district of Haines City, taking the name Main Street (formerly Polk City Road). Crossing US 27, CR 17 continues northwest as Old Polk City Road until it reaches CR 557.

County Road 17A

County Road 17A (CR 17A) takes the name of Masterpiece Road and loops around toward the east of SR 17 in the vicinity of Lake Wales.

County Road 17B

County Road 17B (CR 17B) connects SR 60 to CR 17A in Lake Wales.

References

External links

017
SR017
017
017
U.S. Route 27